Aidan Murphy (born 14 October 2003) is an Australian sprinter. Murphy is the son of former Australian Olympic athlete Tania Van Heer.

Murphy runs for the Saints Athletics Club  in South Australia. He broke two National U20 Records and four State Records in 2022 and won both the Oceania and Australian Open Men's 200 metres titles. Selected for the 2022 World Athletics Championships Murphy made his major event debut in the 200 meters.

References

2003 births
Living people
World Athletics Championships athletes for Australia
Australian male sprinters
21st-century Australian people